Church of the Nativity of the Virgin in Bogatić is a Serbian Orthodox Church, built in 1856 on the foundations where an older building once stood.

References

Serbian Orthodox church buildings in Serbia
19th-century Serbian Orthodox church buildings
1850s establishments in Serbia
Religious organizations established in 1856
Mačva